The Isotta Fraschini Asso 750 was an Italian W 18 water-cooled aircraft engine of the 1930s. Together with the Asso 200 and the Asso 500 the Asso 750 was part of a family of modular engines, that used common and interchangeable components to lower production costs.

Technical description 
The W-18 Asso 750 had three six-cylinder in-line banks made of chrome-manganese steel, each joined by a single cast aluminum head for each bank of cylinders.

Operational history

Variants
Asso 750 Direct-drive, unsupercharged.
Asso 750 R. Development with modified crankcase and crankshaft, fitted with a 0.658:1 reduction gear. Maximum power output .
Asso 750 R.C.
Asso 750 M A  racing development with  bore and  stroke, for the Macchi M.67, re-designated Asso 1000 Ri.

Applications 
 CANT Z.501 (early versions)
 Caproni Ca.111
 Macchi M.C.77
 Savoia-Marchetti S.55
 Savoia-Marchetti S.62
 Savoia-Marchetti S.78

Engines on display
At the Italian Air Force Museum two Isotta Fraschini Asso 750 are exhibited: A direct-drive Asso 750 and an Asso 750 R.C.35 with reduction gear and supercharger.

Specifications (Asso 750)

See also

References

Further reading

1930s aircraft piston engines
Asso 750
W engines